Ischiopsopha lucivorax, common name Alien Beetle, are beetles from the family Scarabaeidae, subfamily Cetoniinae, tribe Schizorhinini.

Subspecies
 Ischiopsopha lucivorax buloloensis Alexis & Delpont, 2000 
 Ischiopsopha lucivorax lucivorax Kraatz, 1890

Description
These beetles have a bright green colour with reddish reflections.

Distribution
This species can be found in Indonesia and Papua New Guinea.

References

Cetoniinae
Beetles described in 1890